Owshtanian (also Romanized as Owshtānīān, Ūshtāneyān, Ūshtānīān, and Ushtāniyān) is a village in Sohrevard Rural District, in the Central District of Khodabandeh County, Zanjan Province, Iran. At the 2006 census, its population was 55, in 12 families.

References 

Populated places in Khodabandeh County